P44 is a regional Ukraine road (P-highway) in Sumy Oblast, Ukraine, half of it running mainly north-south and the other half at an angle. It connects Hlukhiv with Sumy. It begins at Highway P61 and Bilopilskiy Shlyakh in Sumy and passes through Postolne, Synyak, Barylo, Peremoha (Bilopillya Raion), Bilopillya, Vorozhba, Pisky, Klepaly, Ihorivka, Chumakove, Zinove, Putivl, Bobyne, Vyazenka, Banychi, and Peremoha (Hlukhiv Raion), and ends in Hlukhiv at the intersection of Tereschenkiv Street and Kyievo-Moskovska Street (European route E38).

Main route

Main route and intersections with other highways in Ukraine.

See also

 Roads in Ukraine
 Ukraine State Highways

References

External links
 Start of P44 road in Sumy
 End of P44 road in Hlukhiv

Roads in Sumy Oblast